This article is about the demographic features of the population of Slovakia, including population density, ethnicity, education level, health of the populace, economic status, religious affiliations and other aspects of the population. The demographic statistics are from the Statistical Office of the SR, unless otherwise indicated.

Population 
Total population:  (as of ).

Demographic statistics according to the World Population Review in 2021.

One birth every 10 minutes
One death every 9 minutes
One net migrant every 480 minutes
Net gain of one person every 1440 minutes

Population overtime

Population growth rate 
-0.08% (2021 est.) Country comparison to the world: 202nd

Fertility 
The total fertility rate is the number of children born per woman. It is based on fairly good data for the entire period. Sources: Our World In Data and Gapminder Foundation.

1.45 children born/woman (2021 est.) Country comparison to the world: 211th

Mother's mean age at first birth 
27.2 years (2019 est.)

Life expectancy 

total population: 78.07 years
male: 74.56 years
female: 81.82 years (2021 est.)

Age structure 
0-14 years: 15.13% (male 423,180 /female 400,128)
15-24 years: 10.06% (male 280,284 /female 266,838)
25-54 years: 44.61% (male 1,228,462 /female 1,198,747)
55-64 years: 13.15% (male 342,142 /female 373,452)
65 years and over: 17.05% (male 366,267 /female 561,120) (2020 est.)

Median age 
total: 41.8 years. Country comparison to the world: 41st
male: 40.1 years
female: 43.6 years (2020 est.)

Vital statistics

Current vital statistics

 Deaths January 2022 = 5,664
 Deaths January 2023 = 4,915

Languages
Slovak (official) 81.77%, Hungarian 8.48%, Roma 1.84%, Rusyn 0.71%, other or unspecified 7.2% (2021 census)

Employment and income

Unemployment, youth ages 15–24
Total: 19.4%. Country comparison to the world: 81st
Male: 18.3%
Female: 21.2% (2020 est.)

Ethnic groups

The majority of the 5.4 million inhabitants of Slovakia are Slovak (83.82%). Hungarians are the largest ethnic minority (7.75%) and are concentrated in the southern and eastern regions of Slovakia. Other ethnic groups include Roma (1.23%), Czechs, Croats, Rusyns, Ukrainians, Germans, Poles, Gorals, Serbs and Jews (about 2,300 remain of the estimated pre-WWII population of 120,000).

While both international organizations (the United Nations and the World Bank) and the official Slovak statistics office offer population figures for ethnic groups, these figures seldom come close to agreement. Figures for the Roma population (for a variety of reasons) vary between 1% and 10% of the population. In the most recent survey carried out by the Slovak Government's Roma Plenipotentiary, the figure for the percentage of Roma was arrived at through interview with municipality representatives and mayors, according to how many Roma they think live in their jurisdictions. The figure arrived at by this means was in the region of 300,000 (about 5.6%). Note that in the case of the 5.6%, however, the above percentages of Hungarians and Slovaks are lower accordingly.

The official state language is Slovak, and Hungarian is widely spoken in the southern regions.

Despite its modern European economy and society, Slovakia has a significant rural element. About 45% of Slovaks live in villages with fewer than 5,000 inhabitants, and 14% in villages with fewer than 1,000.

Religion

The Slovak constitution guarantees freedom of religion. The majority of Slovak citizens (55,76%) practice Roman Catholicism; the second-largest group consider themselves atheists (23.79%). About 5.27% are Protestants, 4% are Greek Catholics, and 0.93% are Orthodox and Reformed Christian Church 1.56% (2021 census).

See also
 Roma in Slovakia

References

External links

 (in Czech) summary of villages in Hungary in 1864 - 1865, PETROV, Alexej Leonidovich. Sborník Fr. Pestyho Helység névtara-Seznam osad v Uhrách z r. 1864-65, : jako pramen historicko-demografických údajů o slovenských a karpatoruských osadách. Praha :  Česká akademie věd a umění, 1927. 174 s. - available online at University Library in Bratislava Digital Library

 
Society of Slovakia